Henri Diotte (November 30, 1874 – March 8, 1945) was a Canadian politician. He served in the Legislative Assembly of New Brunswick as member of the Conservative party representing Restigouche County from 1921 to 1935.

References

20th-century Canadian politicians
1874 births
1945 deaths
Progressive Conservative Party of New Brunswick MLAs